Pretoria West is a suburb of Pretoria, South Africa, situated  from the city centre. According to the 2011 census, it has a population of 11,535 (1,869.99 per km²).

Notable companies 
Notable companies based in Pretoria West include:

 Pretoria Metal Pressings
Exxaro

References 

Suburbs of Pretoria